There have been several peerage titles created with the name Avondale (or Avandale), referring to the dale (or valley) of the Avon Water in Scotland. The word strath also means valley, and the area is now better known as Strathaven.

The title Earl of Avondale, along with that of Lord Balveny, was created for James Douglas, known as "the Gross", in 1437. He was a younger son of Archibald Douglas, 3rd Earl of Douglas and succeeded to the Earldom of Douglas in 1440 following the deaths of his nephew and great-nephew. The titles were forfeit in 1455 on the attainder of his son James Douglas, 9th Earl of Douglas and 3rd Earl of Avondale.

The second creation was for  Andrew Stuart, who was created Lord Avondale in 1459. He was a son of Sir Walter Stewart and therefore a grandson of Murdoch Stewart, 2nd Duke of Albany. He served as Chancellor of Scotland between 1460 and 1482, and died in 1488, when the title became extinct.

The third creation was for another Andrew Stuart, who was created Lord Avondale in about 1499. He was a great-grandson of Sir Walter Stewart, and thus a great-nephew of the first Lord Avondale. On his death on 9 September 1513, he was succeeded by his son, also named Andrew. The second Lord Avondale exchanged his title for that of Lord Ochiltree on 15 March 1543.

The most recent creation was for Prince Albert Victor, eldest son of the Prince of Wales (later King Edward VII). He was created Duke of Clarence and Avondale and Earl of Athlone on 24 May 1890, but died on 14 January 1892, when the titles became extinct.

Earls of Avondale (1437) 
 James Douglas, 1st Earl of Avondale (1371–1443)
 William Douglas, 2nd Earl of Avondale (1425–1452)
 James Douglas, 3rd Earl of Avondale (1426–1488)

Lord Avondale (1459) 
 Andrew Stewart, 1st Lord Avandale (d. 1488)

Lords Avondale (c. 1499) 
 Andrew Stewart, 1st Lord Avondale (d. 1513)
 Andrew Stewart, 2nd Lord Avondale (d. 1548)

Duke of Clarence and Avondale (1890) 
 Prince Albert Victor, Duke of Clarence and Avondale (1864–1892)

See also 
 Avondale Castle
 Balvenie Castle
 Earl of Douglas
 Earl Castle Stewart

References 

Titles in Scotland